Trencsén county (Latin: comitatus Trentsiniensis / Trenchiniensis; Hungarian: Trencsén (vár)megye; Slovak: Trenčiansky komitát / Trenčianska stolica / Trenčianska župa) was an administrative county (comitatus) of the Kingdom of Hungary. Its territory is now in western Slovakia.

Geography

 
Trencsén county shared borders with the Austrian lands Moravia, Galicia, and Silesia, and the Hungarian counties Árva, Turóc and Nyitra. The county's territory was a strip in the extreme northwestern edge of present-day Slovakia, i.e. the territory between the Czech border, the town of Vágújhely, the Turóc county, the Árva county and the Polish border. The river Vág flowed through the county. Its area was 4456 km² around 1910.

Capitals
The capital of Trencsén County was the Trenčín Castle, and from around 1650 the town of Trencsén.

History
A predecessor of the Trencsén county maybe existed already in the 9th century, at the time of Great Moravia, with a center in Ducové. In the 10th and 11th century, the county was probably temporarily part of Bohemia and then temporarily of Poland (castellania Trecen).

The Trencsén county as a Hungarian comitatus arose at the end of the 11th century, when most parts of the territory were conquered by the Kingdom of Hungary. Traditionally, the office of hereditary lord lieutenant of Trencsén county was held by the Csák, Cseszneky and Illésházy families.

In the aftermath of World War I, Trencsén county became part of newly formed Czechoslovakia, as recognized by the concerned states in 1920 by the Treaty of Trianon. The county as (Trenčianska župa) continued to exist until 1922, but it had completely different powers, etc.

During the existence of the first Slovak State between 1939 and 1945, Trenčín county was recreated again in 1940, but its territory was slightly extended. After World War II Trenčín county became part of Czechoslovakia again. In 1993, Czechoslovakia was split and Trenčín became part of Slovakia.

Demographics

Subdivisions

In the early 20th century, the subdivisions of Trencsén county were:

Notes

See also
Current Trenčín Region of Slovakia

References

External links
 

Counties in the Kingdom of Hungary